

Sino-Australia Challenge 

Australia win series 2-2, 289-264 on points differential

2013 Stanković Continental Champions' Cup 

Australia are 2013 Stanković Continental Champions' Cup (Lanzhou Tournament) champions

Friendly

2013 FIBA Oceania Championship 

Australia men's national basketball team games
2013–14 in Australian basketball